Bart John Mellish (born 25 April 1983) is an Australian politician. He has been an Australian Labor Party member of the Queensland Legislative Assembly since 2017, representing the electorate of Aspley.

Born in Toowoomba, Queensland, Mellish completed his tertiary education at the University of Southern Queensland completing a Bachelor of Science and post-graduate certificate in Environmental Management, as well as completing a Master of Business Administration, specialising in Environmental Management. Before entering politics, he was a transport and economic policy advisor, environmental consultant, rail consultant and policy advisor, and Chief of Staff to Senator Anthony Chisholm.

Mellish was elected to the Legislative Assembly at the 2017 state election, defeating former Newman Government minister Tracy Davis with a 4.3% swing. He was re-elected at the 2020 election, defeating LNP candidate and former Brisbane city councillor Amanda Cooper with a 4% swing, increasing his margin to 5.4%. After his re-election, Mellish was promoted to the position of Assistant Minister to the Premier for Veterans' Affairs, Trade and COVID Economic Recovery.

References

External links
Parliamentary Profile

1983 births
Living people
Members of the Queensland Legislative Assembly
Australian Labor Party members of the Parliament of Queensland
21st-century Australian politicians
Labor Right politicians